Drag 'em Out is an album by organist Shirley Scott recorded in 1963 and released on the Prestige label.

Reception
The Allmusic site awarded the album 3 stars.

Track listing 
 "Drag 'em Out" (Shirley Scott) – 15:46 
 "The Second Time Around" (Sammy Cahn, Jimmy Van Heusen) – 4:41  
 "Out of It" (Scott) – 3:39
 "The Song Is Ended" (Irving Berlin) – 6:36

Personnel 
 Shirley Scott - organ
 Major Holley - bass
 Roy Brooks - drums

References 

1963 albums
Albums produced by Ozzie Cadena
Albums recorded at Van Gelder Studio
Prestige Records albums
Shirley Scott albums